Nimule Airport is a small civilian and military airport serving the town of Nimule and surrounding communities, in South Sudan.

Location
Nimule Airport  is located in Magwi County in Imatong State, in the town of Nimule, near the International border with Uganda.

The geographic coordinates of this airport are: 3° 35' 52.80"N, 32° 5' 24.00"E (Latitude: 3.5980; Longitude: 32.0900). The airport has a single unpaved runway, 1188m. in length.

See also
 Nimule
 Eastern Equatoria
 List of airports in South Sudan

References

External links
Location of Nimule Airport At Google Maps

 

Airports in South Sudan
Eastern Equatoria
Equatoria